The following lists events that happened during 1991 in the Soviet Union and Russia.

The Soviet Union had a transitional government in 1991, during the fall of communism. Every republic in the union had growing nationalism until Christmas of 1991 when Mikhail Gorbachev, the General Secretary of the Communist Party of the Soviet Union and President of the Soviet Union, abandoned the Union at the time of its dissolution. The dissolution created huge changes in politics and territorial claims. NATO scaled back its presence following the dissolution.

Incumbents

Union level
President of the Soviet Union – Mikhail Gorbachev (until 25 December)
General Secretary of the Communist Party of the Soviet Union – Mikhail Gorbachev (until 24 August), Vladimir Ivashko (24–29 August)
Chairman of the Supreme Soviet – Mikhail Gorbachev
Vice President of the Soviet Union – Gennady Yanayev (until 4 September)
Premier of the Soviet Union – 
 until 14 January – Nikolai Ryzhkov
 14 January - 22 August – Valentin Pavlov
 22 August - 6 September – vacant
 6 September - 26 December – Ivan Silayev

Russian Federation
Chairman of the Supreme Soviet of Russia as head of state – Boris Yeltsin (until 10 July)
President of Russia – Boris Yeltsin (from 10 July)
Vice President of Russia – Alexander Rutskoy (Patriots of Russia) (from 10 July)
Prime Minister of Russia – Ivan Silayev (until 26 September), Oleg Lobov (26 September – 6 November, de facto acting Prime Minister), Boris Yeltsin (President as extraordinary head of cabinet from 6 November)

Events

January

Union level and union republics
January Events (Lithuania)

Russia

March

Union level and union republics
1991 Soviet Union referendum

Russia
10 March - 500,000-participants rally on Manezhnaya Square in Moscow. The main slogans of the action were the resignation of the President of the USSR Mikhail Gorbachev, support for Boris Yeltsin, active participation in the all-Union referendum. Organizers: Democratic Russia, Moscow Association of Voters, Memorial Society.
17 March - 1991 Russian presidential referendum: 71% of the participants voted in favor of introducing the post of the President of Russia. At the same day the referendum on the future of the Soviet Union was held.

June

Union level and union republics

Russia
12 June - 1991 Russian presidential election. Boris Yeltsin and Alexander Rutskoy elected as the first President and Vice President of Russia.

July

Union level and union republics
George H.W. Bush and Mikhail Gorbachev sign START I treaty in Moscow

Russia

August

Union level and union republics
19 to 22 August- 1991 Soviet coup d'état attempt
19 August - The "State Committee for the State of Emergency" created from the hardline Union-level functioners wishing to reverse the USSR's disintegration. State of emergency declared in certain regions of the country, military units and tanks entered in Moscow.
22 August - Putschists arrested.

Russia
19 to 22 August - 1991 Soviet coup d'état attempt
19 August - President Yeltsin issued an address "To the citizens of Russia", in which the actions of the State Emergency Committee are characterized as a coup. Yeltsin urged the population to rebuff the putschists. Start of mass pro-democratic rallies in Moscow and Leningrad.
22 August - Putschists arrested. The white-blue-red flag restored as the Russian national flag.

December

Union level and union republics
8 December - Belovezha Accords signed by Russia, Belarus and Ukraine, declared USSR had effectively ceased to exist and established the Commonwealth of Independent States (CIS).
21 December - Alma-Ata Protocol signed by 11 of 15 former union republics except Estonia, Latvia, Lithuania and Georgia, declared USSR had effectively ceased to exist and established the Commonwealth of Independent States (CIS).
26 December - Dissolution of the Soviet Union

Russia
25 December - Russian Soviet Federative Socialist Republic officially renamed into the Russian Federation.
27 December - The Russian Federation succeeded the seat of USSR in the United Nations (UN).

Births
5 March - Daniil Trifonov, Concert Pianist
20 July - Marina Yakhlakova, Concert Pianist

Deaths
26 January - Mikhail Plyatskovsky, songwriter
1 April - Rina Zelyonaya, actress
7 April – Oleg Babak, Soviet army officer (born 1967)
9 May – Yanka Dyagileva, Siberian poet and singer-songwriter (born 1966)
23 July - Nora Gal, translator
25 July - Lazar Kaganovich, Stalin-era Soviet official
8 August - Ivan Kozhedub, World War II fighter ace
22 August - Boris Pugo, USSR Minister of the Interior, member of the Emergency Committee (GKChP), suicide
24 August - Marshal Sergey Akhromeyev, GKChP assistant, suicide
27 August - Mike Naumenko, rock musician
6 October - Igor Talkov, rock musician, shot
12 October - Arkady Strugatsky, writer

References

See also
1991 in fine arts of the Soviet Union
List of Soviet films of 1991

 
Soviet Union
Soviet Union
Soviet Union